Åshild is a Norwegian female given name from Old Norse Áshildr (áss = god, hildr = battle).

Persons with the given name Åshild 
Åshild Anmarkrud (born 1939), Norwegian politician
Åshild Breie Nyhus (born 1975), Norwegian musician/artist
Åshild Hauan (1941–2017), Norwegian politician
Åshild Irgens (born 1976), Norwegian illustrator
Åshild Karlstrøm Rundhaug (born 1955), Norwegian politician
Åshild Ulstrup (born 1934), Norwegian author and radio journalist

Notes 

Norwegian feminine given names